The 1955–56 DDR-Oberliga season was the eighth season of the DDR-Oberliga, the top level of ice hockey in East Germany. Four teams participated in the league, and SG Dynamo Weißwasser won the championship.

Regular season

References

External links
East German results 1949-1970

East
DDR-Oberliga (ice hockey) seasons
1955 in East German sport
1956 in East German sport
Ger